The  is a Japanese railway line in Kagawa Prefecture, which connects Kawaramachi Station in Takamatsu with Nagao Station in Sanuki. It is owned and operated by the Takamatsu-Kotohira Electric Railroad. The line color is green.

Station list
All stations are located in Kagawa Prefecture. Station number "N00" is used for Takamatsu-Chikkō Station, and "N01" is for Kataharamachi Station on the Kotohira Line.

History

References

Rail transport in Kagawa Prefecture
Nagao Line
Standard gauge railways in Japan
Articles containing video clips